The following is the final results of the Iranian Volleyball Super League (Velayat Cup) 2003/04 season.

Standings

References 
 volleyball.ir 
 Parssport

League 2003-04
Iran Super League, 2003-04
Iran Super League, 2003-04
Volleyball League, 2003-04
Volleyball League, 2003-04